The Men's Windy City Open 2014 is the men's edition of the 2014 Windy City Open, which is a PSA World Series event Gold (prize money: $115 000 ). The event took place at the University Club of Chicago in the United States from 26 February to 3 March. Grégory Gaultier won his first Windy City Open trophy, beating Ramy Ashour in the final.

Prize money and ranking points
For 2014, the prize purse was $115,000. The prize money and points breakdown is as follows:

Seeds

Draw and results

See also
PSA World Tour 2014
Women's Windy City Open 2014
Metro Squash Windy City Open

References

External links
PSA Windy City Open 2014 website
Windy City Open 2014 official website

Windy City Open
Windy City Open
Windy City Open
Windy City Open
Windy City Open